Haggard's leaf-eared mouse (Phyllotis haggardi) is a species of rodent in the family Cricetidae.
It is found only in Ecuador.

References

 Baillie, J. 1996.  Phyllotis haggardi.   2006 IUCN Red List of Threatened Species.   Downloaded on 9 July 2007.
Musser, G. G. and M. D. Carleton. 2005. Superfamily Muroidea. pp. 894–1531 in Mammal Species of the World a Taxonomic and Geographic Reference. D. E. Wilson and D. M. Reeder eds. Johns Hopkins University Press, Baltimore.

Phyllotis
Mammals of Ecuador
Mammals described in 1908
Taxa named by Oldfield Thomas
Taxonomy articles created by Polbot
Endemic fauna of Ecuador